Emili Vicente Vives (2 January 1965 – 25 May 2017) was a Spanish footballer who played as a midfielder. 

As a player, Vicente represented UE Lleida in Segunda División, Balaguer and Tàrrega. He managed Segunda División B club Lleida Esportiu since July 2011 until June 2012.

Vicente died in a bicycle accident in Andorra in May 2017.

Managerial statistics

References

External links

1965 births
2017 deaths
People from La Seu d'Urgell
Sportspeople from the Province of Lleida
Spanish footballers
Footballers from Catalonia
Association football midfielders
Segunda División players
Segunda División B players
Tercera División players
UE Lleida players
CF Balaguer footballers
CF Gavà players
Spanish football managers
UE Lleida managers
Lleida Esportiu managers
CF Reus Deportiu managers
FC Andorra managers
Cycling road incident deaths
UE Tàrrega players
Segunda División B managers
Spanish expatriate football managers
Expatriate football managers in Andorra
Deaths in Andorra